Erigeron filifolius is a North American species of flowering plants in the family Asteraceae known by the common names thread-leaf fleabane.

Erigeron filifolius is widespread across much of western North America. It has been found in western Canada (British Columbia) and the western United States, primarily east of the crest of the Cascade Range of Washington, Oregon, and northern California extending eastward to southern Idaho and northeast Nevada.

Each stem sometimes produces only 1 flower head per stem, sometimes flat-topped clusters of 10 or more. Each head may contain as many as 125 white, blue, pink, or lavender ray florets surrounding numerous yellow disc florets.

References

External links

filifolius
Flora of the Western United States
Plants described in 1834
Taxa named by William Jackson Hooker
Taxa named by Thomas Nuttall
Flora without expected TNC conservation status